Iwami Dam is a gravity dam located in Akita Prefecture in Japan. The dam is used for flood control and power production. The catchment area of the dam is 73.1 km2. The dam impounds about 95  ha of land when full and can store 19300 thousand cubic meters of water. The construction of the dam was started on 1970 and completed in 1978.

References

Dams in Akita Prefecture
1978 establishments in Japan